The Riddler: Year One is an American comic book based on the DC Comics character the Riddler. The six-issue limited series—written by Paul Dano and illustrated by Stevan Subic—is a tie-in prequel to the film The Batman (2022), in which Dano also played Edward Nashton / the Riddler, with the series focusing on the character's life and his descent into criminality before the events of the film. It published bimonthly under DC's adult-oriented Black Label imprint beginning October 25, 2022.

Publication history

Development 
During the production of the film The Batman (2022), Paul Dano—who played Edward Nashton / the Riddler in the film—conceived ideas for his character's backstory, which he shared with director Matt Reeves, who encouraged him to develop them into a comic book, though he was hesitant to go ahead with the project. Reeves then contacted DC Comics and told Dano the next day that the publisher was interested in hearing his proposal for a Riddler-centric comic. In March, Reeves and DC had officially announced that Dano would be writing a six-issue limited series titled The Riddler: Year One, with Stevan Subic serving as illustrator. The comic is intended to be a tie-in prequel to The Batman, depicting Nashton's life and his descent into criminality before the events of the film.

Dano said in July that he had not yet finished writing the series, whose experience he described as being "totally incredible". He described his experience working with Subic as being "super collaborative". Dano had wrote treatments of the overall story and sent them to Subic, to which they collaborated in developing the story together. They had held Zoom meetings, in which Subic shared his screen and showed Dano his layouts. While they discussed the storytelling and eventually continued working, Subic pencilled and Dano continued to write. They would then discuss the story that same month when Dano attended DC's panel at San Diego Comic-Con, where he promoted the series.

Publication 
The Riddler: Year One was published bimonthly under DC's adult-oriented Black Label imprint beginning October 25, 2022.

Issues

Plot

Chapter One: A New Beginning 
Edward Nashton, a forensic accountant at the KTMJ firm for over five, is angered as he believes himself to be more than his boss, Zach; he believes Zach gained his position because of his education and upbringing, having only worked three months. Experiencing various mental health issues, hallucinations, self-loathing, and suicidal thoughts, Nashton spends time visiting various online websites. He has grown to resent Gotham City, believing it to be corrupt and develops an admiration for the vigilante Batman, learning more about his activities via online websites. 

Nashton is assigned to investigate a file for the New Beginnings Animal Rescue legal team. He discovers a recurring payment of $10,000, and decides to investigate after becoming suspicious. Tracing its origins to the Waterfront Industries company, Nashton realizes the money was split into smaller payments to avoid discovery. As he goes home, he witnesses Batman rescuing a young woman from being mugged by two thugs. He posts about his experience online, and believes that Batman is "hope incarnate" rescuing Gotham City, to which other users also commented on his post expressing admiration. 

The following day, Nashton details to Zach about his previous investigations. Zach takes credit for Nashton's findings and reports it to his boss, Mr. Stone. Nashton decides to inquire Mr. Stone about the payments, and follows him to the Corner Diner. Mr. Stone dismisses him, and attempts to intimidate Nashton to stop investigating. One of the thugs Nashton encountered yesterday, Higgins, was standing trial, claims Batman mugged and planted drugs on him to incriminate him. Nashton learns that Higgins was an employee of New Beginnings and a former member of Salvatore Maroni's organization. He visits the company despite Stone's threats, though leaves after attracting attention from asking about Higgins. He then notices Mr. Stone and Zach meeting with the woman Batman rescued yesterday, and deduces that the events are connected.

Chapter Two: People Lie, Numbers Don't 
Nashton returns to work, where Zach is promoted to "Junior Division Director". Skeptical of Mr. Stone's dismissal of his findings, Nashton breaks into his office while everybody leaves that night to confirm the legitimacy of his discoveries. Discovering KTMJ legally represents Waterfront Industries, he also discovers that Mr. Stone shredded papers detailing its finances. Nashton continues his investigation, identifying payments from a man named Mr. Joon, and deciding to scrutinize the Renewal Program.

Feeling despondent, Nashton returns home to be accosted by a stranger claiming to know his name. Becoming increasingly wary, he examines his Renewal Applications and surmises the Renewal Program could've been response for his impoverished state. After investigating New Beginnings and Mr. Joon, he discovers Mr. Joon makes routine payments to a young woman. Later, Mr. Stone meets with Nashton, claiming to have discovered something regarding New Beginnings and its accounts, and requests him to prepare a potential case against Wayne Enterprises. Though optimistic with the opportunities presented, Nashton is skeptical of Mr. Stone's intentions.

Nashton becomes inspired by the Batman's activities and decides to resort to take control of the situation. He hacks into the CCTV system of New Beginnings, and realize that they are illegally selling and distributing the Drops drug. Fully becoming radicalized by Batman's tactics, he purchases military equipment to aid his operations. Nashton begins tracking Mr. Joon from a rooftop and witnesses a confrontation with Mr. Stone, discovering profits are being stolen. Mr. Joon then shows photos of the woman he gave money to, revealing her to be his daughter, intended on helping her receive enough money to leave Gotham. He also learns that they are working for Carmine Falcone. Mr. Stone isn't convinced and orders Higgins to kill him, and learns Higgins had stole the profits to pay his bail. The next morning, Joon's daughter confronts Higgins prior to leaving Gotham.

Chapter Three: I Know Now What I Must Become 
Nashton decides to record a video of Joon's murder to send to the police. He then continues to work as normal, hoping to uncover incriminating details of Wayne Enterprises. He continues his investigations of New Beginnings, hoping for police involvement, and learns that Ana, Mr. Joon's daughter, had ran the drug front organization following his death. Furthermore, Nashton also continues to be harassed by the mysterious stranger who claimed to know his name. 

He eventually learns the police will not be involved, and contacts Ana through an online messaging service. However, he gets ghosted after asking her about the lack of police involvement. Restarting his Waterfront Industries investigations, he finds a disused warehouse in Gotham's docks, previously used as a front for Maroni's crime syndicate, and witnesses an exchange between Higgins and a GCPD officer. He then contacts Ana again, revealing to her that he knows about the GCPD's corruption and their money laundering for Drops peddling. She states that other lower income people are working for someone, whose identity she refuses to disclose. Closely investigating Maroni's assets, he realizes that they were integrated into the Renewal Program. Deducing that wealthy officials are exploiting criminals to conceal their resources and create slush funds, he decides to persuade Mr. Stone into giving him further access to Wayne Enterprises accounts by claiming to find irregularities in some accounts. Mr. Stone tells him that account information is stored in the Gotham Mountain security. Nashton contacts various message boards, and eventually finds another Wayne employee user, with whom he manages to infiltrate the storage and obtain account information. 

Throughout the course of several months, Nashton's thorough investigations of Wayne Enterprises and KTMJ accounts. Initially yielding no results, he then reinvestigates KTMJ accounts after learning that the firm represents the Renewal Project. He manages to find out that many Renewal Programs funds were laundered to prominent city figures, including Mayor Don Mitchell, Commissioner Pete Savage, and District Attorney Gil Colson. Moreover, he also learned of Falcone's role in Maroni's drug bust, becoming a "rat" against Maroni, and wielding these connections to further perpetuate his crime organization. Becoming extremely outraged by these events, Nashton's mental health becomes negatively impacted and decides to undergo extreme methods to expose the corruption after seeing the Bat-Signal shine. Adopting the alias of "the Riddler", Nashton wears an old military cold weather mask to hide his appearance, and hosts an extremist online community with approximately 500 followers. During these, Nashton plots an elaborate scheme to expose the scandal, murder prominent people involved, and deliver retribution, as he deems the city corrupt and beyond redemption.

Reception 
The announcement of The Riddler: Year One was met with a highly positive response from fans, who expressed their approval and enthusiasm for the comic on Twitter, as the topic became one of the most popular trends on the social network at the time.

References 
  Text was copied from The Riddler (The Batman film) at Batman Fandom, which is released under a Creative Commons Attribution-Share Alike 3.0 (Unported) (CC-BY-SA 3.0) license.

2022 comics debuts
2022 in comics
American comics
Comics based on films
Comic book limited series
Comics publications
DC Comics limited series
DC Comics titles
Prequel comics
Supervillain comics